T. arvense may refer to:
 Thlaspi arvense, the field penny-cress, a foetid Eurasian plant species naturalized throughout North America
 Trifolium arvense the haresfoot clover, a clover species

See also
 Arvense (disambiguation)